Giovanni Francesco Zabello (active c. 1546) was an Italian painter and engraver. He was born in Bergamo and eventually moved to Russia to help create many works of art. There he also founded the Russian branch of the Zabello family.

References

Further reading

Artists from Bergamo
16th-century Italian painters
Italian male painters
Italian Baroque painters
Italian engravers
Year of death unknown
Year of birth unknown
Italian emigrants to Russia